This is a list of airborne early warning aircraft. An AEW aircraft is an airborne radar system generally used to detect incoming aircraft, ships, vehicles, missiles, and other projectiles and provide guidance to fighter and attack aircraft strikes.

List of AEW aircraft 

|-

|-
| Antonov An-71 || USSR || Jet || 1985 || Production ||  || 2 engines
|-
| AgustaWestland Model 112/EH-101A || Italy || Rotorcraft || 2009 || Production ||  || 3 engines
|-
| AgustaWestland Merlin Crowsnest || UK || Rotorcraft || 2021 || Production ||  ||  
|-
| Avro Shackleton AEW.2 || UK || Propeller || 1972 || Production ||  || 4 engines
|-
| Beriev A-50 || USSR || Jet || 1978 || Production ||  ~ || 4 engines
|-
| Boeing 707 Phalcon/Condor || Israel || Jet || 1993 || Production || + || 4 engines
|-
| Boeing 737 AEW&C || US || Jet || 2004 || Production ||  || 2 engines
|-
| Boeing B-29 AEW || US || Propeller || 1951 || Production ||  || 4 engines
|-
| Boeing EC-137D || US || Jet || 1972 || Production ||  || 4 engines
|-
| Boeing E-3 Sentry || US || Jet || 1975 || Production ||  || 4 engines
|-
| Boeing E-767 || Japan || Jet || 1996 || Production ||  || 2 engines
|-
| Boeing PB-1W Flying Fortress || US || Propeller || 1945 || Production ||  || 4 engines
|-
| Bombardier Global 6000 || Sweden || Jet || 2018 || ordered || + ~ || 2 engines 
|-
| British Aerospace Nimrod AEW3 || UK || Jet || 1980 || Project ||  || 4 engines
|-
| Britten-Norman Defender AEW || UK || Propeller || 1988 || Prototype || + || 2 engines
|-
| Douglas Skyraider AEW variants || US || Propeller || 1947 || Production ||  || 1 engine
|-
| DRDO AEW&CS || India || Jet || 2011 || Production ||  || 2 engines
|-
| EADS CASA C-295 AEW || Spain || Propeller || 2011 || Prototype ||  || 2 engines
|-
| Embraer R-99A/E-99/EMB 145 AEW&C || Brazil || Jet || 1999 || Production || + || 2 engines
|-
| Fairey Gannet AEW.3 || UK || Propeller || 1958 || Production ||  || 1 double engine
|-
| Fairey Gannet AEW.7 || UK || Propeller || n/a || Project ||  || 1 engine
|-
| Goodyear ZP2N-1W/ZPG-2W/EZ-1B || US || Aerostat || 1955 || Production ||  || 
|-
| Goodyear ZPG-3W || US || Aerostat || 1958 || Production ||  || 
|-
| Grumman E-1 Tracer || US || Propeller || 1956 || Production ||  || 2 engines
|-
| Grumman E-2 Hawkeye || US || Propeller || 1960 || Production ||  || 2 engines
|-
| Grumman TBM-3W Avenger || US || Propeller || 1944 || Production ||  || 1 engine
|-
| Gulfstream G550/IAI Eitam || Israel/US || Jet || 2006 || Production ||  || 2 engines
|-
| Hawker Siddeley P.139B || UK || Jet || 1966 || Project ||  || 2 engines
|-
| Kamov Ka-31 || USSR || Rotorcraft || 1983 || Production || + || 
|-
| KJ-1 AEWC || China || Propeller || 1971 || Prototype ||  || 4 engines
|-
| KJ-200 'Y-8W Balanced Beam' || China || Propeller || 2001 || Production ||  || 4 engines
|-
| KJ-2000 || China || Jet || 2003 || Production ||  || 4 engines
|-
| KJ-3000 || China || Jet || 2013 || Prototype ||  || 4 engines
|-
| Lockheed AMSS (S-3 derivative) || US || Jet || n/a || Project ||  || 2 engines
|-
| Lockheed WV-2/PO-2W/EC-121 Warning Star || US || Propeller || 1949 || Production ||  || 4 engines
|-
| Lockheed EC-130V Hercules || US || Propeller || 1991 ||  ||  || 4 engines
|-
| Lockheed P-3 Orion AEW&C || US || Propeller || 1988 || Production ||  || 4 engines
|-
| Saab 340 AEW&C (S 100 B/D Argus) || Sweden || Propeller || 1994 || Production ||  || 2 engines
|-
| Saab 2000 AEW&C || Sweden || Propeller || 2008 || Production ||  || 2 engines
|-
| Shaanxi KJ-500 || China || Propeller || 2013 || Production || + || 4 engines
|-
| Shaanxi Y-8W || China || Propeller ||  || Production ||  || 4 engines
|-
| Shaanxi Y-8J AEW || China || Propeller || 1998 || Prototype ||  || 4 engines
|-
| Shaanxi Y-8 AWACS || China || Propeller ||  || Production ||  || 4 engines
|-
| Shaanxi ZDK-03 AEW&C || China || Propeller || 2010 || Production ||  || 4 engines
|-
| Sikorsky SH-3H AEW || Spain || Rotorcraft ||  || Production ||  || 
|-
| Sikorsky HR2S-1W || US || Rotorcraft || 1958 || Production ||  || 
|-
| Tupolev Tu-126 || USSR || Propeller || 1962 || Production ||  ~ || 4 engines
|-
| Vickers Wellington Ic "Air Controlled Interception" || UK || Propeller || 1944 || Production ||  || 2 engines 
|-
| Westland Sea King AEW.2/AEW.5/ASaC7 || UK || Rotorcraft || 1982 || Production ||  || 
|-
| Xian JZY-01 || China || Propeller || 2012 || Prototype ||  || 2 engines
|-
| Xian KJ-600 || China || Propeller || || In development || || 2 engines
|-
| Yakovlev Yak-44 || Russia || Propeller || 1993 || Project ||  || 2 engines
|}

See also 

 List of AEW&C aircraft operators
 List of maritime patrol aircraft

References

Citations

Bibliography 
 
 
 
 
 
 
 
 
 

Early warning systems